Return of the Ape Man is a 1944 American film distributed by Monogram Pictures. It was directed by Philip Rosen with top-billed star Bela Lugosi and supporting actors John Carradine, George Zucco, Frank Moran, Judith Gibson and Michael Ames.

Plot

Two professors find a prehistoric caveman frozen in ice during an Arctic expedition. Professor Dexter (Bela Lugosi) and Professor John Gilmore (John Carradine) bring the frozen exhibit back home and soon devise a plan. They want to implant a more evolved brain into the caveman, with hopes of being able to control and utilize him.

Cast 
 Bela Lugosi as Professor Dexter
 John Carradine as Professor John Gilmore
 George Zucco and Frank Moran as Ape Man
 Judith Gibson as Anne
 Michael Ames as Steve
 Mary Currier as Mrs. Gilmore
 Ed Chandler as Sergeant
 Ernie Adams as Tramp
Uncredited
 George Eldredge as Patrolman on beat
 Horace B. Carpenter as Theater watchman

Cast notes

George Zucco is co-credited on screen and in the publicity, along with Moran, as having played the Ape Man. At the onset of the laboratory scene where Prof. Dexter (Lugosi) and Gilmore (Carradine) are preparing to melt the caveman free from the block of ice, Zucco is shown in the Ape Man makeup - albeit briefly. Zucco's prominent nose, as well as his injured and withered left arm/hand (from a WWI injury) are clearly visible facing the camera. The shot then switches away from the Ape Man. When it returns again to the same shot, Moran has replaced Zucco. The producers later explained Zucco became ill during the filming and kept his footage as a cost-saving measure while using Moran as a replacement actor for the remainder of the film.

References

External links

1944 films
1944 horror films
American horror films
American black-and-white films
Monogram Pictures films
Films directed by Phil Rosen
Films about cavemen
1940s English-language films
1940s American films